Denebola is an extinct genus of whale belonging to the family Monodontidae. It contains a single known species, Denebola brachycephala. It is the earliest known ancestor of the beluga, Delphinapterus leucas, and dates from the Upper Miocene period. A fossil was found in the Baja California peninsula, indicating that the family once existed in warmer waters.

References

Monodontidae
Prehistoric toothed whales
Miocene mammals of North America
Fossil taxa described in 1984